Caro Llewellyn (born 1965) is an Australian business executive, artistic director, festival manager and nonfiction writer. As of 2020, she is chief executive officer of the Wheeler Centre in Melbourne.

Career 
Llewellyn is the daughter of Richard Llewellyn and poet Kate Llewellyn. She grew up in Adelaide.

Early in her career Llewellyn had a job booking bands for venues. She entered the literary world and became product manager for Random House. From 2002 to 2006 Llewellyn was director of the Sydney Writers' Festival. In 2006 she moved to New York where she was employed by Salman Rushdie to manage the PEN World Voices Festival from 2007. She was diagnosed with multiple sclerosis in 2009 and found she was no longer able to read. At this time she had been appointed the inaugural director of what later became the Wheeler Centre but resigned before she began in the role. After about three years she discovered that her sight had improved and she was able to read novels again.

For Columbia University, she served as artistic director of the Paris-based Festival des Écrivains du Monde from 2012 to 2015. During this period, from 2013 to 2015, she ran the New Literature from Europe Festival in New York. Back in Australia in 2017, Llewellyn was appointed Director of Experience and Engagement at Museums Victoria.

Her 2019 memoir, Diving into glass, was shortlisted for the 2020 Stella Prize.

In 2020 Llewellyn was appointed chief executive officer of the Wheeler Centre. She will vacate the role in July 2023.

Works

References 

Living people
Australian non-fiction writers
Festival directors
Writers from Adelaide
Businesspeople from Adelaide
1965 births